The Brighton Marina Act 1968 is an Act of the Parliament of the United Kingdom, which is still in force. The Act authorised the Brighton Marina Company to construct a marina and other works on land reclaimed from the sea approximately 2 miles east of the centre of Brighton.

Provisions of the Act
The Act is divided into seven parts:
Part I - Preliminary
Part II - Works
Part III - Use of harbour and harbour charges
Part IV - Miscellaneous
Part V - Protective Provisions
Part VI - General

Part V - Protective Provisions
Subsection s. 55(1) of Part V states:
For the protection of the corporation the next following four sections of this Act shall unless otherwise agreed in writing between the Company and the corporation apply and have effect.

Subsection s. 59(1) of Part V states:
The Company shall not construct or erect, to the south of the cliff face, any work, building or structure to a greater height than the height, at the time of such construction or erection, of that part of the cliff face which lies immediately to the north thereof.

Brighton Marina Outer Harbour Development 2006
In 2006 Brighton & Hove City Council received legal advice that the council would not be acting unlawfully under Part V of the Act if they gave permission for the construction of the Outer Harbour development at the marina.

References

Brighton Marina Act 1968, Parliamentary Archives, Houses of Parliament

Brighton and Hove
United Kingdom Acts of Parliament 1968